Rangin or Rangeen (colorful) may refer to:

People
Rangin Dadfar Spanta, former Afghan politician and cabinet member in Hamid Karzai's government
Saadat Yaar Khan Rangin, 18th/19th century Urdu poet

Other
"Rangin", a song by Sajjad Ali

See also
 Rangin Ban, Iran
 Rangin Jajabara, 1975 Odia movie